Hammond Island may refer to:
 Hammond Island, Queensland
 Hammond Island, California